George Gibbs (born 23 December 1953) is an English former professional footballer who played as a defender and midfielder.

Career
Born in London, Gibbs played in the United States and Canada for Rochester Lancers, Toronto Blizzard, Tulsa Roughnecks and Kansas City Comets.

References

1953 births
Living people
English footballers
Rochester Lancers (1967–1980) players
Toronto Blizzard (1971–1984) players
Tulsa Roughnecks (1978–1984) players
Kansas City Comets (original MISL) players
North American Soccer League (1968–1984) players
North American Soccer League (1968–1984) indoor players
Major Indoor Soccer League (1978–1992) players
Association football midfielders
English expatriate sportspeople in the United States
Expatriate soccer players in the United States
English expatriate footballers
English expatriate sportspeople in Canada
Expatriate soccer players in Canada
Association football defenders